Kulkani (also Romanized as Kūlḵanī) is a village in Kulkani Rural District, Majin District, Darreh Shahr County, Ilam Province, Iran. At the 2006 census, its population was 29, in 5 families. The village is populated by Lurs.

References 

Populated places in Darreh Shahr County
Luri settlements in Ilam Province